Yoann Bigné (born 23 August 1977 in Rennes, France) is a retired French football player that last played for Stade Brestois.

References

1977 births
Living people
French footballers
France under-21 international footballers
Stade Rennais F.C. players
Ligue 1 players
OGC Nice players
Stade Brestois 29 players
Ligue 2 players
France youth international footballers
Footballers from Rennes
Association football midfielders